Dan Bush is an American film director and screenwriter best known for The Signal (2007), which he co-directed and co-wrote with Jacob Gentry and David Bruckner.

Early life 
Bush attended the University of South Carolina and University of North Carolina at Chapel Hill.

Career 
With Jacob Gentry and David Bruckner, he co-wrote and co-directed The Signal, which premiered at the 2007 Sundance Film Festival.  The three had worked together previously in various projects in Atlanta.  Bush collaborated with Ben Lovett, who scored The Signal, in the short film Ghost of Old Highways, which won Best Music and Best Cinematography at the Charlotte Film Festival.  Bilge Ebiri of New York wrote that his short film A Day in the Life (2006) is "one of the coolest short films we’ve seen in recent years".  The Reconstruction of William Zero premiered at the Fantasia Festival on July 20, 2014.  In January 2014, Screen Daily reported that The Trust was to begin pre-production in April 2014.

Awards and nominations 
In 2008, Bush was nominated for the Independent Spirit John Cassavetes Award along with Bruckner and Gentry for The Signal.

Filmography

References

External links 
 

Living people
American film directors
American male screenwriters
Year of birth missing (living people)